Ivano-Frankivsk National Technical University of Oil and Gas is an institution of higher education in Ivano-Frankivsk, Ukraine.

Since its establishment in 1967, the university has been known for preparing qualified and experienced specialists for the oil and gas industries. However, it has expanded to offer education in economics, management and law that is directly related to the needs of energy industry.

Ivano-Frankivsk Oil and Gas University has a two-pronged approach toward education of its students: in the classrooms and in the field. In the classroom, students are provided the theoretical knowledge. Then, by working at university "field-classrooms" or by holding internships with regional businesses and organizations, the future specialists gain practical experience.

Structure

Colleges/Faculties
 College of automatics and computer science
 College of electrification and information-measurement technologies
 College of economics and entrepreneurship
 College of oil-gas logistics
 College of management and informational activities
 College of management of industrial and regional economical development
 College of architecture of tourist complexes
 Gas-oil industrial College
 Geological investigatory College
 Engineer-ecological College
 Mechanical College

See also
FC Fakel Ivano-Frankivsk

External links
 Official Web Page of Ivano-Frankivsk National Technical University of Oil and Gas

References 

Education in Ivano-Frankivsk
Universities and institutes established in the Soviet Union
Universities and colleges in Ivano-Frankivsk Oblast
Engineering universities and colleges in Ukraine
Educational institutions established in 1967
Buildings and structures in Ivano-Frankivsk Oblast
Petroleum engineering schools
1967 establishments in Ukraine
Fossil fuels in the Soviet Union
National universities in Ukraine
Institutions with the title of National in Ukraine